Hull Island may refer to:

 Orona in the Phoenix Islands, in the Republic of Kiribati, and once known as Hull Island
 Îles Maria, a coral atoll in the Pacific Ocean, within the Austral Islands, and also formerly known as Hull Island
 Hull Island, in the Beverley Group of the Northumberland Islands off the coast of Queensland, Australia

Canada
Île Hull, name of the island that Downtown Hull, Quebec is on
Hull Island (British Columbia), in the Central Coast/Johstone Strait region of British Columbia